Griswold is an unincorporated community in the southeast corner of Oregon County, in the Ozarks of southern Missouri.

History
A post office called Griswold was established in 1887, and remained in operation until 1907. The community has the name of James Griswold, a local merchant.

References

Unincorporated communities in Oregon County, Missouri
Unincorporated communities in Missouri